AE3 may refer to:
A size designation for Constantinian bronze coins
AE1/AE3 antibody cocktail used in immunohistochemistry
Aero Ae 04, a Czechoslovakian aircraft